Venture is a populated place in the parish of Saint John, Barbados. Venture is mainly a residential area, located at Highway Y. It is home of the Trinity United Pentecostal Church.

See also

 List of cities, towns and villages in Barbados

References

Saint John, Barbados
Populated places in Barbados